Genes is a quarterly peer-reviewed open access scientific journal that is published by MDPI. The editor-in-chief is J. Peter W. Young (University of York). It covers all topics related to genes, genetics, and genomics.

Abstracting and indexing 
The journal is abstracted and indexed in:
 Chemical Abstracts
 EBSCOhost
 EMBASE
 Science Citation Index Expanded
 Scopus

References

External links 
 

Genetics journals
Open access journals
Publications established in 2010
Quarterly journals
English-language journals
MDPI academic journals